Joseph Charles Klink (born February 3, 1962) is an American former professional baseball pitcher. He played in Major League Baseball (MLB) from 1987 to 1996 for the Minnesota Twins, Oakland Athletics, Florida Marlins, and Seattle Mariners. Klink once went 90 consecutive games without allowing a home run, the longest by a left-handed pitcher since at least 1957 and possibly the longest such streak of all time.

Klink attended St. Thomas University, and in 1982 he played collegiate summer baseball with the Harwich Mariners of the Cape Cod Baseball League. He was selected by the New York Mets in the 36th round of the 1983 MLB Draft.

References

External links

1962 births
Living people
Klink, Joe
Columbia Mets players
Orlando Twins players
Portland Beavers players
Huntsville Stars players
Tacoma Tigers players
Modesto A's players
St. Thomas Bobcats baseball players
Harwich Mariners players
Albuquerque Dukes players
Buffalo Bisons (minor league) players
Major League Baseball pitchers
Baseball players from Pennsylvania
Minnesota Twins players
Seattle Mariners players
Oakland Athletics players
Florida Marlins players
Tacoma Rainiers players